José Enrique Rodó is a small town in the Soriano Department of western Uruguay.

Geography

History
On 12 June 1924, the populated centre was declared a "Pueblo" (village) by the Act of Ley N° 7.729. Previously, it had been head of the judicial sections "San Martin" and "Costa Durazno". On 17 November 1964, its status was elevated to "Villa" (town) by the Act of Ley N° 13.299.

Population
In 2011 José Enrique Rodó had a population of 2,120.
 
Source: Instituto Nacional de Estadística de Uruguay

Places of worship
 St. Joseph the Worker Parish Church (Roman Catholic)

References

External links
INE map of José Enrique Rodó

Populated places in the Soriano Department